Les Liens du sang is a French title that may refer to:

 Rivals, a 2008 French film known as Les Liens du sang in French
 Bad Blood, a 2017 Canadian TV series known as Les liens du sang in French